Kuznetsk is a town in Penza Oblast, Russia, located in the foothills of the Volga Upland, mainly on the left bank of the Truyov River. Population:

Administrative and municipal status
Within Russia's framework of administrative divisions, Kuznetsk serves as the administrative center of Kuznetsky District, even though it does not form a part of it. As an administrative division, it is incorporated separately as the town of oblast significance of Kuznetsk—an administrative unit with the status equal to that of the districts. As a municipal division, the town of oblast significance of Kuznetsk is incorporated as Kuznetsk Urban Okrug.

History 

 founded the settlement of Truyovo on the river  in 1699. It became known as Truyovo-Voskresenskoe and then as Naryshkino. An ukaz of Catherine II renamed the village as Kuznetsk in November 1780.

Twin towns and sister cities

Kuznetsk is twinned with:
 Gyula, Hungary (1970)
 Dimitrovgrad, Russia (1972)

References

Notes

Sources

Cities and towns in Penza Oblast
Kuznetsky Uyezd (Saratov Governorate)
Populated places established in 1618
1618 establishments in Russia